Maria E. Cimini (born August 26, 1976) is an American politician and a former Democratic member of the Rhode Island House of Representatives, representing District 7 from 2011 to 2015.

Education
Cimini earned her BA in political science and her MSW from Rhode Island College.

Elections
2014 Cimini was defeated in the Democratic primary by Daniel P. McKiernan, receiving 933 votes to his 1,075 votes.
2012 Cimini was unopposed for both the September 11, 2012 Democratic Primary, winning with 874 votes and the November 6, 2012 General election, winning with 3,366 votes.
2010 When District 7 Democratic Representative Joanne Giannini retired and left the seat open, Cimini ran in the September 23, 2010 Democratic Primary, winning with 1,207 votes (59.3%) and was unopposed for the November 2, 2010 General election, winning with 2,773 votes.

References

External links

Maria Cimini at Ballotpedia
Maria E. Cimini at OpenSecrets

Place of birth missing (living people)
1976 births
Living people
Democratic Party members of the Rhode Island House of Representatives
Politicians from Providence, Rhode Island
Rhode Island College alumni
Women state legislators in Rhode Island
21st-century American women